is a former Japanese football player.

Club career
Mikuriya was born in Chiba Prefecture on August 29, 1977. After graduating from high school, he joined Yokohama Marinos in 1996. Although he played as right side midfielder from first season, he lost his opportunity to play in 1997. In 1998, he moved to Brummell Sendai (later Vegalta Sendai). He played many matches as left side back. In 2000, his opportunity to play decreased and he retired end of 2000 season.

National team career
In June 1997, Mikuriya was selected Japan U-20 national team for 1997 World Youth Championship. At this tournament, he played 2 matches as right side midfielder.

Club statistics

References

External links

library.footballjapan.jp

1977 births
Living people
Association football people from Chiba Prefecture
Japanese footballers
Japan youth international footballers
J1 League players
J2 League players
Japan Football League (1992–1998) players
Yokohama F. Marinos players
Vegalta Sendai players
Association football defenders